The 1994 NCAA Division III football season, part of the college football season organized by the NCAA at the Division III level in the United States, began in August 1994, and concluded with the NCAA Division III Football Championship, also known as the Stagg Bowl, in December 1994 at Salem Football Stadium in Salem, Virginia. The Albion Britons won their first Division III championship by defeating the Washington & Jefferson Presidents, 38−15. The Gagliardi Trophy, given to the most outstanding player in Division III football, was awarded to Carey Bender, running back from Coe.

Conference standings

Conference champions

Postseason
The 1994 NCAA Division III Football Championship playoffs were the 22nd annual single-elimination tournament to determine the national champion of men's NCAA Division III college football. The championship Stagg Bowl game was held at Salem Football Stadium in Salem, Virginia for the second time. As of 2014, Salem has remained the yearly host of the Stagg Bowl. Like the previous nine tournaments, this year's bracket featured sixteen teams.

Playoff bracket

See also
1994 NCAA Division I-A football season
1994 NCAA Division I-AA football season
1994 NCAA Division II football season

References